The men's shot put event at the 2002 World Junior Championships in Athletics was held in Kingston, Jamaica, at National Stadium on 16 July.  A 6 kg (junior implement) shot was used.

Medalists

Results

Final
16 July

Qualifications
16 Jul

Group A

Group B

Participation
According to an unofficial count, 28 athletes from 24 countries participated in the event.

References

Shot put
Shot put at the World Athletics U20 Championships